Mårdalen is a Norwegian surname. Notable people with the surname include:

Jon Mårdalen (1895–1977), Norwegian cross-country skier
Kjetil Mårdalen (1925–1996), Norwegian nordic combined skier

Norwegian-language surnames